The Savage Horde is a 1950 American Western film directed by Joseph Kane, written by Kenneth Gamet, and starring Wild Bill Elliott, Lorna Gray, Grant Withers, Barbra Fuller, Noah Beery, Jr., Jim Davis and Bob Steele. It was released on May 22, 1950 by Republic Pictures.

On the run from the U.S. Army in a small Utah town, John "Ringo" Baker becomes involved in a land feud between local ranchers while watching for the Army patrols closing in on him.

Cast
Wild Bill Elliott as John "Ringo" Baker
Lorna Gray as Livvy Weston 
Grant Withers as Wade Proctor
Barbra Fuller as Louise Cole
Noah Beery, Jr. as Glenn Larrabee 
Jim Davis as Lt. Mike Baker
Bob Steele as Dancer 
Douglass Dumbrille as Col. Price
Will Wright as Judge Thomas Cole
Roy Barcroft as Fergus
Earle Hodgins as Buck Yallop
Stuart Hamblen as Stuart
Hal Taliaferro as Sgt. Gowdy
Lloyd Ingraham as Sam Jeffries
Marshall Reed as Henchman Polk
Crane Whitley as Greb
Charles Stevens as Morellis
James Flavin as Guard

References

External links 
 

1950 films
American Western (genre) films
1950 Western (genre) films
Republic Pictures films
Films directed by Joseph Kane
American black-and-white films
1950s English-language films
1950s American films